Bubble Bobble 4 Friends is a platform arcade game developed and published by Taito in Japan, and published by ININ games worldwide. The game is part of the Bubble Bobble arcade series. The game's reception had been mixed when it was first released on the Nintendo Switch, but the PlayStation 4 version was better received one year later.

Gameplay 
The game has a gameplay similar to other titles in the franchise. The game characters are 3D models, with only the background in 2D. Players control two dragons, Bub or Bob, that can trap enemies in bubbles and pop them in order to eliminate them from the screen. When eliminating an enemy, a fruit is generated that can be collected as a reward to increase the player's score.

The game contains 50 different stages that can be played in two difficulty levels. To unlock the most difficult level, the player must first complete the 50 stages in the normal level. Also included is the original Bubble Bobble arcade game released in 1986.

Release 
The game was released for the Nintendo Switch, initially in Europe and Australia, on November 19, 2019. In February and March 2020, it was released, respectively, in Japan and American continents. Later, a free update known as Bubble Bobble 4 Friends - The Baron is Back was released on November 17, 2020, with a PlayStation 4 version releasing in the same day. A Steam version, under the name Bubble Bobble 4 Friends: The Baron's Workshop, was announced on March 18, 2021, during Square Enix Presents. It was released on September 30, 2021.

Reception 
The Switch version of the game received mixed reviews. On Metacritic, the game has a weighted average score of 68 out of 100, based on 38 critics, indicating "mixed or average reviews". Regarding the version released later for the PlayStation 4, called Bubble Bobble 4 Friends: The Baron is Back, received 75 out of 100 points on Metacritic, based on 5 reviews. Although the environment and gameplay were highly praised, the small number of stages was pointed out as negative points.

Britt Roberts of Nintendo Life praised the gameplay, describing it as fluid and fun, and highlighted the timelessness of the formula adopted by the game since the first version.

References

2019 video games
Bubble Bobble
Nintendo Switch games
Platform games
PlayStation 4 games
Taito games
Windows games
Arcade video games
Video games developed in Japan